Afonso d'Escragnolle Taunay (11 July 1876 – 20 March 1958) was a Brazilian writer and historian.

Biography
Afonso was born in the Palácio Rosado, the residence of Santa Catarina's governor. He was the only legitimate son of Alfredo d'Escragnolle Taunay, Viscount of Taunay, and Cristina Teixeira Leite (daughter of the Baron of Vassouras). He was the grandson of Félix Taunay, Baron of Taunay, and the great-grandson of the Count of Escragnolle, a French nobleman. He had one half-brother, João Pedro Nolasco, who was born in Paris and married a Basque woman, Maria de Lima.

He graduated in civil engineering at the Polytechnic School of Rio de Janeiro, around 1900. He taught at Polytechnic School of São Paulo. He was the director of Museu Paulista (now Ipiranga Museum) from 1934 to 1937. He married Sara de Sousa Queirós, and had four children: Ana Queirós Taunay, Paulo Taunay, Augusto de Escragnolle Taunay and Clarisse Taunay.

He was a member of the Brazilian Academy of Letters.

Taunay is commemorated in the scientific name of a species of Brazilian lizard, Colobodactylus taunayi.

Works
Guia da Secção Histórica do Museu Paulista, 1937

References

Brazilian writers
1876 births
1958 deaths
People from Florianópolis
Members of the Brazilian Academy of Letters
Brazilian nobility
Brazilian people of French descent
Museu do Ipiranga